ARTBO is an annual international art fair in Bogotá, Colombia that takes place every October. It is Colombia's official international art fair, and is organized by the Bogotá Chamber of commerce. ARTBO is one of the largest art fairs in Latin America, and brings together art galleries, artworks, curators, collectors, artists, and the public as one of the most important cultural events for the country. The fair is directed by María Paz Gaviria, daughter of former Colombian President, César Gavira. The fair features more than 75 galleries with works from over 500 artists. The fair also focuses on cultural and academic programming with a mission to promote access and growth of the arts community in Colombia and beyond.

The fair's origins date back to 2005, when Bogotá's chamber of commerce took on the project of strengthening and consolidating the local art scene. ArtBo was created as a nonprofit project to promote Colombia's culture and arts both locally and abroad through the participation of key Colombian art galleries as well as International galleries. It was started by the Colombian Government as a reaction to the ongoing Colombian conflict, as a way to help rebrand Colombia's capital city as a destination for culture, business, and investment.

Since 2012, under the direction of María Paz Gaviria, the fair has grown in size to becoming Latin America's second largest art fair, next to Zona Maco in Mexico. Internationally, ARTBO is sometimes referred to as the "Art Basel of Latin America".

Editions 

 ArtBo 2005 – Inaugural edition; 29 galleries from 7 countries
 ArtBo 2012 – New Director Maria Paz Gaviria takes over direction of ArtBo; 56 galleries from 14 countries
 ArtBo 2015 – 11th Edition; 3000 artworks and 84 galleries from 33 cities
 ArtBo 2016 – 12th Edition; 35,000 visitors and galleries from 28 cities, and accounted for 80% of the total annual sale volume for Colombian Art Galleries that year
 ArtBo 2017 – 13th Edition; 75 participating galleries and over 350 represented artists
 ArtBo 2018 – 14th Edition; 3000 artworks from over 350 represented artists

References

Contemporary art fairs
Art festivals in Colombia
Festivals in Bogotá
Annual events in South America